The Stolen Ranch is a 1926 American silent Western film directed by William Wyler and starring Fred Humes, Louise Lorraine and William Bailey. The future star Janet Gaynor appeared as an extra in the film.

Plot

Cast
 Fred Humes as 'Breezy' Hart 
 Louise Lorraine as Mary Jane 
 William Bailey as Sam Hardy 
 Ralph McCullough as Frank Wilcox 
 Nita Cavalier as June Marston 
 Edward Cecil as Lawyer James Morton 
 Howard Truesdale as Tom Marston
 Slim Whitaker as Henchman Hank 
 Jack Kirk as Ranch Hand Slim

References

Bibliography
 Munden, Kenneth White. The American Film Institute Catalog of Motion Pictures Produced in the United States, Part 1. University of California Press, 1997.

External links
 

1926 films
1926 Western (genre) films
Universal Pictures films
Films directed by William Wyler
American black-and-white films
Silent American Western (genre) films
Films with screenplays by George H. Plympton
1920s English-language films
1920s American films